Six ships of the United States Navy have been named USS Cheyenne, in honor of the city of Cheyenne, Wyoming.

  was a tugboat in use during July and August 1898.
  was originally the  monitor Wyoming, renamed in 1909 to make the name Wyoming available for the battleship .
  was a  light cruiser, renamed  a year before she was launched in 1942.
  was a planned  light cruiser, but construction was canceled on 12 August 1945.
  was a  miscellaneous auxiliary, launched 26 June 1945 and struck 15 June 1973.

United States Navy ship names